The Payen or Aubrun-Payen AP.10 was an experimental aircraft designed and built in collaboration with Nicolas Roland Payen in the 1930s.

Design
The AP.10 was a tailless single-seat aircraft of reverse-delta configuration. In this it differed markedly from Payen's extensive line of sharply-swept delta canard designs.

Specifications

References

Bibliography

AP.10
1930s French experimental aircraft
Single-engined tractor aircraft
Tailless aircraft